Cyperus clarus is a species of sedge that is native to parts of eastern Australia.

See also 
 List of Cyperus species

References 

clarus
Plants described in 1939
Taxa named by Stanley Thatcher Blake
Flora of Queensland
Flora of New South Wales